Zaramin-e Olya (also Romanized as Zarāmīn-e ‘Olyā; also known as Zarāmīn, Zarāmīn-e Bālā, and Zarrāmīn-e Bālā) is a village in Fazl Rural District, Zarrin Dasht District, Nahavand County, Hamadan Province, Iran. At the 2006 census, its population was 573, in 135 families.

References 

Populated places in Nahavand County